Calycorectes wurdackii is a species of plant in the family Myrtaceae. It is endemic to Peru.

References

Flora of Peru
Calycorectes
Vulnerable plants
Taxonomy articles created by Polbot